Sultan Rana, (born 3 November 1951) is a former Pakistani first-class cricketer. One of his brothers, Shakoor Rana, was an international cricket umpire while two of his other brothers, Shafqat and Azmat Rana played Test cricket for Pakistan.

References

1951 births
Living people
Punjabi people
Pakistani cricketers
Habib Bank Limited cricketers
Punjab University cricketers
Pakistan Universities cricketers
Lahore Greens cricketers
Punjab A cricketers
Lahore A cricketers
Punjab (Pakistan) cricketers
Cricketers from Lahore